Ceguaca is a municipality in the Honduran department of Santa Bárbara.

Demographics
At the time of the 2013 Honduras census, Ceguaca municipality had a population of 4,948. Of these, 50.12% were Mestizo, 44.10% White, 3.88% Black or Afro-Honduran, 1.58% Indigenous (1.39% Lenca) and 0.32% others.

References

Municipalities of the Santa Bárbara Department, Honduras